is a former Japanese football player. He played for Japan national team.

Club career
Oenoki was educated at and played for Shimizu Higashi High School. He won the national high school championship with his teammates including Kenta Hasegawa and Takumi Horiike. He continued his study and football at Waseda University.

After graduating from the university in 1988, he joined Japan Soccer League side Yamaha Motors (current Júbilo Iwata). When Japan's first-ever professional league J1 League started, Shimizu S-Pulse was founded in his local city. He joined the club in 1992 and re-united with his high school teammates Hasegawa and Horiike. He helped the club to win the 1996 J.League Cup, the second stage of the 1999 J1 League, and the 1999–2000 Asian Cup Winners' Cup.

He made more than 250 league appearances for Shimizu and retired after the 2002 season.

National team career
Oenoki was capped 5 times for the Japanese national team between 1989 and 1990. His first international appearance came on May 5, 1989 in a friendly against Korea in Seoul. he also played at 1990 World Cup qualification.

Coaching career
Oenoki worked as a coach at Shimizu S-Pulse in 2003 and he was the manager of Waseda University between 2004-2007. Under his guidance, Waseda was promoted from the Tokyo Prefectural University League to the Kanto League Div 2 in 2004, and then to Div 1 in 2005. The club finished runners-up in the national intercollegiate championship in 2006. He acquired the S-Class coaching license that is a prerequisite to manage a J.League club in 2007. In 2008, he returned to Shimizu S-Pulse and became a manager for youth team. In July 2014, he became a manager for top team as Afshin Ghotbi successor. However the club performance is bad he resigned in July 2015.

Club statistics

National team statistics

Managerial statistics

References

External links
 
 Japan National Football Team Database
 
 

1965 births
Living people
Waseda University alumni
Association football people from Shizuoka Prefecture
Japanese footballers
Japan international footballers
Japan Soccer League players
J1 League players
Júbilo Iwata players
Shimizu S-Pulse players
1988 AFC Asian Cup players
Japanese football managers
J1 League managers
Shimizu S-Pulse managers
Association football midfielders